Mister Smith Entertainment is a British film distribution company involved in the acquisition, financing, production, licensing and distribution sales of films for the global theatrical market. Co-founded by David Garrett and Constantin Film, Mister Smith was established on 1 May 2012.

Mister Smith Entertainment currently has distribution deals with Amblin Partners, Constantin, Entertainment One, and Broad Green Pictures, and also acquires films from independent filmmakers and producers.

History 
Mister Smith Entertainment was founded by David Garrett on 1 May 2012, as a joint venture between Garrett and Constantin Films. Garrett previously had co-founded Summit Entertainment where he served as president until his resignation in February 2012, following Summit's acquisition by Lionsgate. The company was established with Ralpho Borgos as chief of international licensing and distribution, and Annasivia Britt as vice president of the company's marketing and publicity department. The first film distributed by Mister Smith was The Mortal Instruments: City of Bones, which was acquired at the 2012 Cannes Film Festival.

In August 2012, Mister Smith entered a deal with DreamWorks Pictures, wherein Mister Smith would handle the international distribution sales for DreamWorks' films in various international territories. The following month, Mister Smith brokered multiple deals on behalf of DreamWorks with various film distributors across Europe, including Entertainment One, Constantin, Nordisk Film and Italia Film. Mister Smith took control of distribution in these territories from Walt Disney Studios Motion Pictures, which continued to distribute for DreamWorks elsewhere, including North America, until 2016. Mister Smith's first DreamWorks film to distribute was The Fifth Estate in 2013. Mister Smith's international deal with DreamWorks continued after the latter company was restructured into Amblin Partners in 2015. 

In 2013, Mister Smith expanded its executive team, opening additional offices in Los Angeles, California and Paris, France.

On 25 February 2015, Broad Green Pictures acquired a 45% minority stake in Mister Smith, which resulted in the latter serving as international sales and distribution arm for Broad Green, while retaining a right of first refusal to handle the sales of Broad Green's films.

Filmography

References

External links 
 

Mass media companies based in London
Entertainment companies established in 2012
Film production companies of the United Kingdom
2012 establishments in the United Kingdom
Joint ventures
International sales agents